Zakiganj is an upazila of Sylhet District in Sylhet Division, Bangladesh.

History
There are a few theories behind the name of Zakiganj. The first is that is derived from Shah Zaki, a pir who established a khanqah on the banks of the Kushiyara River. A ganj, Perso-Bengali suffix meaning 'marketplace'  or 'neighbourhood', was then set up around the khanqah. In memory of Shah Zaki, nearby places are named Pirerkhal and the village Pirerchok. Another theory is that it is named after a man named Ghulam Zaki Majumdar, whose brother Karim Majumdar is who Karimganj district is said to have been named after.

Zakiganj was established as a thana in 1947 and was previously a part of the greater Karimganj district. Along with Karimganj, Zakiganj was to be a part of the Dominion of India but this was prevented by a delegation led by Sheikh Mujibur Rahman. In the aftermath of the Bangladesh Liberation War of 1971, mass graves were found in Atgram Bazar and Kaliganj Bazar. Zakiganj became an upazila on 1 August 1983.

A 17th century stone inscription was found in the Ghayebi Dighi Masjid in Barothakuri and it is now in display at the Bangladesh National Museum.

Geography
It has 29836 households and total area .

It is situated on the north bank of Kushiyara River, opposite Karimganj town of Assam, India.

Climate

Demographics
As of the 1991 Bangladesh census, Zakiganj has a population of 174038. Males constitute 50.55% of the population, and females 49.45%. This Upazila's eighteen up population is 85935. Zakiganj has an average literacy rate of 30.8% (7+ years), and the national average of 32.4% literate. Religions: Muslim 81.48%, Hindu 18.47%, Buddhist, Christian and others 0.05%.

Points of interest
 Derivation of two river (Kushiyara River and Surma River) from Barak River of India
 Customs wharfage
 Hills of Atgram

Administration
Zakiganj Upazila is divided into Zakiganj Municipality and nine union parishads: Barahal, Barathakuri, Birorsri, Kajalshar, Khaskanakpur, Kolachora, Manikpur, Sultanpur, and Zakiganj. The union parishads are subdivided into 108 mauzas and 278 villages.

Zakiganj Municipality is subdivided into 9 wards and 25 mahallas.

Upazila Chairmen

Notable people

 Abdul Kahir Chowdhury, Bangladesh Nationalist Party politician
 Abdul Latif Chowdhury Fultali, Sufi scholar
 Akhlaq Choudhury, British High Court judge
 Hafiz Ahmed Mazumder, chairman of Pubali Bank Board of Directors and Bangladesh Red Crescent Society
 Mahmudur Rahman Majumdar, brigadier
 Mohammad Abdul Haque, bureaucrat
 Obaidul Haque, Islamic teacher and politician
 Salman Shah, mainstream film actor
 Ubaidul Haq, former khatib of Baitul Mukarram

See also
 Upazilas of Bangladesh
 Districts of Bangladesh
 Divisions of Bangladesh

References

 
Upazilas of Sylhet District